Agelasa nigriceps is a species of skeletonizing leaf beetle in the family Chrysomelidae, found in the Palearctic. Its most common host plant is Actinidia arguta, although the beetles have been evolving in Japan to use Pterostyrax hispidus as a host plant.

References

Galerucinae
Palearctic insects
Beetles described in 1860
Taxa named by Victor Motschulsky